Laghetto is a frazione of the comune of Colico, Lombardy, northern Italy.

Laghetto is a new name designed to combine many places, such as Borgonuovo, Fiumarga, La Cà and Corte, in a single village, the name officially appearing in 1770. In 1760 began the migration of some families who lived in Olgiasca following a tax dispute with the Austrian.

Sights include the church of Saint Fidelis of Como.

Sources
Giovanni Del Tredici, Elena Fattarelli, Colico e il Monte Legnone – Sentieri e Storia, CAI Colico, 2007

See also 
Colico
Villatico
Curcio
Olgiasca

Frazioni of the Province of Lecco
Colico

it:Colico#Laghetto